Fisk is a small city in Butler County, Southeast Missouri, United States. It is located right along the Butler-Stoddard County line on U.S. Route 60, along the St. Francis River. The population was 312 at the 2020 census.

Fisk is included within the Poplar Bluff Micropolitan Statistical Area.

History
A post office called Fisk has been in operation since 1899. The community was named after Samuel J. Fisk, the proprietor of a local sawmill.

Geography
Fisk is located in the flatlands of southeast Missouri on the west bank of the St. Francis River approximately midway between Poplar Bluff and Dexter.

Demographics

2010 census
As of the census of 2010, there were 342 people, 163 households, and 88 families residing in the city. The racial makeup of the city was 99.42% White and 0.58% from two or more races. Hispanic or Latino of any race were 0.29% of the population.

There were 163 households, of which 25.8% had children under the age of 18 living with them, 36.8% were married couples living together, 14.1% had a female householder with no husband present, 3.1% had a male householder with no wife present, and 46.0% were non-families. 40.5% of all households were made up of individuals, and 17.2% had someone living alone who was 65 years of age or older. The average household size was 2.10 and the average family size was 2.80.

The median age in the city was 46 years. 19.9% of residents were under the age of 18; 6.6% were between the ages of 18 and 24; 21.9% were from 25 to 44; 32.7% were from 45 to 64; and 18.7% were 65 years of age or older. The gender makeup of the city was 47.1% male and 52.9% female.

2000 census
As of the census of 2000, there were 363 people, 169 households, and 102 families residing in the city. The population density was 1,099.8 people per square mile (424.7/km2). There were 189 housing units at an average density of 572.6 per square mile (221.1/km2). The racial makeup of the city was 98.35% White, 0.83% African American, 0.55% Native American, and 0.28% from two or more races. Hispanic or Latino of any race were 0.83% of the population.

There were 169 households, out of which 25.4% had children under the age of 18 living with them, 42.0% were married couples living together, 14.8% had a female householder with no husband present, and 39.6% were non-families. 35.5% of all households were made up of individuals, and 18.3% had someone living alone who was 65 years of age or older. The average household size was 2.15 and the average family size was 2.80.

In the city, the population was spread out, with 23.7% under the age of 18, 6.1% from 18 to 24, 24.8% from 25 to 44, 24.8% from 45 to 64, and 20.7% who were 65 years of age or older. The median age was 42 years. For every 100 females, there were 80.6 males. For every 100 females age 18 and over, there were 75.3 males.

The median income for a household in the city was $19,886, and the median income for a family was $27,000. Males had a median income of $20,500 versus $16,250 for females. The per capita income for the city was $11,577. About 17.0% of families and 30.7% of the population were below the poverty line, including 53.3% of those under age 18 and 18.6% of those age 65 or over.

Climate
Climate is characterized by relatively high temperatures and evenly distributed precipitation throughout the year.  The Köppen Climate Classification subtype for this climate is "Cfa" (Humid Subtropical Climate).

Education
Twin Rivers R-X School District serves the community and operates the Fisk School as well as Twin Rivers High School in Broseley.

Fisk has a lending library, the Fisk Community Library.

References

External links
 Historic maps of Fisk in the Sanborn Maps of Missouri Collection  at the University of Missouri

Cities in Butler County, Missouri
Cities in Missouri